The Charleston riot occurred on March 28, 1864, in Charleston, Illinois, after Union soldiers and local Republicans clashed with local insurgent Democrats known as Copperheads. By the time the riot had subsided, nine were dead and twelve had been wounded.  It is generally thought that one of the events that triggered the riot was the treatment of Judge Charles H. Constable by Union soldiers.  The soldiers humiliated Constable by making him swear allegiance to the federal government, due to his decision to allow four Union deserters to go free in Marshall, Illinois. When the riot began, Judge Constable was holding court in Charleston.

Copperheads

The news coverage of the event stated that the Peace Democrats were responsible for beginning the event. One such news source, from the Chicago Tribune, later reprinted in the Charleston Courier, labeled Nelson Wells as the instigator of the conflict. Most articles published from the time, insist that the whole event transpired as a more spontaneous event and was not directly prompted by any one individual. The most likely explanation is that the event occurred because a sizable presence of both Copperheads and Union soldiers had been in town that day. Also many sources speculate that a sizable portion of the participants, at least on the side of the Peace Democrats, had been drinking quite heavily all day, and this led to the outbreak that resulted in the confrontation. At any rate, the fighting only lasted a few moments. But by the time the affair was over, the Copperheads had been run out of Charleston. Rewards had been issued for the capture of any of those whom fled the scene. Included in those who left town, was John O’Hair, the leader of the Copperheads, who had been the sheriff of Coles County. Out of those killed, only two had been Copperheads, Nelson Wells and John Cooper; the other participants had been either captured or escaped. Other Union troops were called in from Mattoon to assist the soldiers fighting in Charleston, but by the time their train arrived, none of the instigators were left in the town. Fifteen prisoners were eventually held for seven months, initially in Springfield, Illinois. President Lincoln, whose father and stepmother had lived in Coles County, waived the prisoners' right to Habeas Corpus and ordered their removal to Fort Delaware in the East. He ordered their release on November 4, 1864. Two of the prisoners had been indicted for murder and were exonerated by trial in December, 1864. Twelve other Copperheads had also been indicted for murder. They were never captured, and the indictments were annulled in May 1873.

The terms Copperheads and Butternuts were used to describe the larger movement, which has been known as Peace Democrats. This political affiliation which stirred up support, as David Montgomery points out in Beyond Equality: Labor and the Radical Republicans, by incorporating the fears that the federal government's war effort sought to usurp the constitution. The copperheads incorporated a racial component to their disdain for the Republican war effort, as Montgomery points out, that emancipated Negroes would flood the North, because of the Emancipation Proclamation. Using racially charged rhetoric, Copperheads sought to unite opposition to the Radical Republicans. This had become a national phenomenon during the American Civil War. Democrat sympathizers were battling to keep their country from becoming, in their eyes, too radical.

Coles County

The Copperheads represented a political affiliation that was staunchly opposed to President Lincoln, the draft, and abolition of slavery. This group favored an armistice to end the Civil War because they opposed the war itself. Most components of Copperhead ideology centered on the mistrust of the implications the war presented to American society. In particular, the aim to free the slaves had become an issue that some white natives of Illinois took issue with. The Civil War had split the country into factions, either side chose to support or oppose the aim to reincorporate the Southern states back into the Union. The Copperheads believed the Lincoln Administration had been out of line by abolishing slavery. Some citizens of Coles County accepted the ideology that it was not in the best interest of the country to free the slaves. Although the exact number is hard to gauge it has been estimated, by Victor Hicken in Illinois in the Civil War, that Coles County had been a significant pocket of Copperhead sympathizers. This idea is supported by the fact that John O’Hair, the leader of the Copperheads, had been the sheriff of Coles County during the Civil War.

In the end, the Charleston Riot provides a good example of how local events of Coles County history have fit into national currents as well. The Copperheads of Coles County had been different from other dissenting groups from around the country, in that they chose to use physical violence as their method of dissent. By killing Union soldiers, who had become the emblem of Federal government control, the Copperheads were attempting to project their anger toward the government. The draft, a strong central government, and racism fueled the Copperheads support within the county. In March 1864, these national tensions boiled over in the small town of Charleston, creating one of the most interesting events in the history of the county.

Casualties

The nine men killed include: Major Shuball York, Fifty-fourth Illinois Infantry; Privates Oliver Sallee and James Goodrich, Company C, and John Neer and Alfred Swim, Company G, Fifty-fourth Illinois Infantry; Private William G. Hart, Sixty-second Illinois Infantry; John Jenkins, citizen (loyal); Nelson Wells, citizen (copperhead); John Cooper, citizen (copperhead).  The wounded include: Colonel G.M. Mitchell, Fifty-fourth Illinois; Privates William H. Decker, Company G, Landford Noyes, Company I, and George Ross, Company C, Fifty-fourth Illinois; citizens Thomas Jeffers, William Giolman, Young E. Winkler, Robert Winkler, John W. Herndon, and George J. Collins.   Colonel G.M. Mitchell prepared this list as part of a report he sent to Lieutenant Colonel James Oakes on April 8, 1864.

54th Illinois Infantry Regiment

The Adjutant General's Report records the event.

″January 1864, three-fourths of the Regiment re-enlisted, as veteran volunteers, and were mustered February 9, 1864. Left for Mattoon, Illinois, for veteran furlough, March 28. Veteran furlough having expired, the Regiment re-assembled at Mattoon. The same day an organized gang of Copperheads, led by Sheriff O’Hair, attacked some men of the Regiment at Charleston, killing Major Shubal York, Surgeon, and four privates, and wounding Colonel G. M. Mitchell. One hour later the Regiment arrived from Mattoon and occupied the town, capturing some of the most prominent traitors.″

Dyer's Regimental History records the riot in the Regimental Battle Honors

″Veterans on furlough March and April. Riot at Charleston, I11., March 28°

See also
List of incidents of civil unrest in the United States
List of Battles Fought in Illinois

Notes

Sources
https://publish.illinois.edu/ihlc-blog/2020/03/31/the-charleston-riot-of-1864/

Charleston Plain Dealer, March 31, 1864; and Illinois Copperheads: Analyzing the Documents compiled by Terry Barnhart
Sampson, Robert D.,  "Pretty Damned Warm Times: The 1864 Charleston Riot and 'the inalienable right of revolution.'"  Illinois Historical Journal 89 no. 2 (Summer 1996): 99–116.
Wilson, Charles Edward, History of Coles County, Illinois. Chicago, 1905.
List of Depositions for March 28, 1864 Charleston Riot, Coles County Courthouse, Charleston.
 Barry, Peter J. The Charleston, Illinois Riot, March 28, 1864, 3 Road Lake Park, Champaign, IL. 2007, 283 pages, 15 pictures
 Barry, Peter J. "The Charleston Riot and its Aftermath: Civil, Military, and Presidential Responses", Journal of Illinois History, 7(Summer 2004):82–106
 Dg, Cw. “Riot and Murder in Charleston, Illinois.” Civil War Daily Gazette, 27 Nov. 2013

Riots and civil disorder in Illinois
1864 riots
Riots and civil unrest during the American Civil War
Illinois in the American Civil War
1864 in Illinois
March 1864 events
History of racism in Illinois
Political riots in the United States